Świdermajer is a distinct Polish architectural style developed in late 19th and early 20th century in Masovia along the railroad linking Warsaw with Otwock. The style was applied almost exclusively to wooden villas of the middle classes. Developed by Michał Elwiro Andriolli, the style combined traditional elements of local wooden architecture with the Swiss style popular after the world fair in Vienna of 1873 (wide roofs), Russian traditional houses of the common people (wooden porches with windows) and some elements of the decorative art from the Podhale region.

Origins
The name Świdermajer was a play on the words "Biedermeier" and "Świder", the latter being the name of both a river along which a number of villas were built and a village between Warsaw and Otwock considered the 'Świdermajer capital'. As local neologism, the word was popularized by Konstanty Ildefons Gałczyński in an epigram called "Wycieczka do Świdra".

References

 Świdermajer.pl 
 Swidermajer gallery, info and  collection of media
 Photos of a typical house, and the people

External links
 A Guide to the Wooden Villas of Otwock

Architecture in Poland
Swidermajer
Swidermajer